Nikola Stojković  (Serbian Cyrillic: Никола Стојковић; born 2 February 1995) is a Serbian football midfielder who plays for FK Dubocica in the Serbian SuperLiga.

References

External links
 
 Nikola Stojković stats at utakmica.rs
 Nikola Stojković stats at footballdatabase.eu

Living people
1995 births
Association football midfielders
Serbian footballers
Red Star Belgrade footballers
FK BSK Borča players
FK Metalac Gornji Milanovac players
FK Zemun players
FK Smederevo players
Serbian SuperLiga players
Serbian First League players